Cybina is a river in Greater Poland, a right affluent of Warta. It starts near village Iwno and after 43 km falls into the right branch of Warta, which is also called Cybina or Kanał Ulgi, in Poznań. Cybina flows through two big lakes: Swarzędzkie Lake and Lake Malta. This last one is a barrier lake.

References
Wojciech Z. Owsianowski, Szlaki wodne Wielkopolski wyd. I, Wydawnictwo Poznańskie, Poznań 1972

Rivers of Poland
Rivers of Greater Poland Voivodeship